Flaming Youth is a 1923 book, controversial in its time, by Samuel Hopkins Adams. 

In the 1920s, Adams wrote two novels, Flaming Youth and Unforbidden Fruit, dealing with the sexual urges of young women in the Jazz Age. These novels had a sexual frankness that was surprising for their time, and Adams published them under the pseudonym "Warner Fabian" so that his other works would not be tainted by any scandal.

In his retrospective essay "Echoes of the Jazz Age," writer F. Scott Fitzgerald argued that Adams' novel persuaded certain moralistic Americans that their young girls could be "seduced without being ruined" and thus altered the sexual mores of the nation. The novel was adapted into the silent movie Flaming Youth in 1923. A reviewer for the Cincinnati Enquirer noted that the film was "far from being a faithful translation of the book on which it was based" since film censorship at the time would have required the elision of some scenes which appear in the novel.

References

Bibliography

External links

 The full text of Flaming Youth at HathiTrust Digital Library
 

Works published under a pseudonym
American novels adapted into films
1923 American novels
Fiction set in 1923
Jazz culture
Novels set in the Roaring Twenties
Boni & Liveright books